Caffeine-Free Pepsi is a version of the cola Pepsi that omits the caffeine that is customarily part of a cola. It was introduced under the brand name "Pepsi Free" in 1982 by PepsiCo. It was 99.7 percent caffeine free. A sugar-free variant was also introduced and known as "Diet Pepsi Free," The "Pepsi Free" name itself was phased out in 1987, and today these colas are known simply as "Caffeine-Free Pepsi" and "Caffeine-Free Diet Pepsi."

Background
When it was first introduced, Caffeine-Free Pepsi's label background was red, but to avoid any confusion with Coca-Cola, the background color was changed to gold in 1987. As part of Pepsi's changing their background to blue in 1998, Pepsi Caffeine Free's background changed to blue with the letters outlined in gold. In 2008, the caffeine-free version reverted to a gold background. Caffeine-Free Coca-Cola labels also have a gold background. The logo letters are bordered in red for the regular variety; in the case of the diet variety, they are entirely red in color.

When introduced, Pepsi Free was available in cans, 2-liter bottles, and 20-ounce glass bottles. Caffeine-Free Pepsi is currently available in cans, 16 oz. plastic bottles and 2 liters, though availability varies from store to store (for instance, 16 oz. bottles are typically only available in convenience stores, and some grocers may only have the product in 12 oz cans, if they carry it at all).

In popular culture
Two cans of Pepsi Free are seen, at separate times, in the 1983 film Mr. Mom.

Two-liter bottles and six-packs of cans of Pepsi Free appear in a refrigerator case behind Sylvester Stallone's character in the grocery store scene in the 1986 film Cobra.

Pepsi Free was the subject of a scene in the 1985 film Back to the Future. Upon entering a café in 1955, Marty McFly (Michael J. Fox) asks for a Tab (Coca-Cola's first version of a sugar-free soft drink, which was not available until 1963) and is told that he cannot have a "tab," unless he orders something. He then asks for a Pepsi Free (also not available in the 1950s) and is told, "If you want a Pepsi, pal, you're gonna pay for it!" ("Free" is here being mistaken for gratis.) Finally, he asks for "something without any sugar in it," and is served black coffee.

A can of Diet Pepsi Free can be seen beside Marty's alarm clock towards the beginning of the movie when Doc (Christopher Lloyd) calls him to remind him to meet him at the mall. The can is also seen toward the end of the movie when Marty wakes up in the morning at his house in 1985.

Notes

External links
Pepsi Can Archive

PepsiCo cola brands
Products introduced in 1982